Faruk Aksoy (born 1964 in Istanbul) is a Turkish film director known for his film, the Fetih 1453 (2012).

References

External links

Turkish film directors
Living people
1964 births
Film people from Istanbul
Date of birth missing (living people)